The Pocantico River is a  tributary of the Hudson River in western central Westchester County, New York, United States. It rises from Echo Lake, in the town of New Castle south of the hamlet of Millwood, and flows generally southwest past Briarcliff Manor to its outlet at Sleepy Hollow. Portions of the towns of Mount Pleasant and Ossining are within its  watershed.

Writer Washington Irving, who lived in the area for most of his life, was inspired by the undeveloped area above the river's mouth to write his classic "The Legend of Sleepy Hollow". Later in the 19th century much of the land was purchased by the Rockefeller family as part of their Kykuit estate; today much of that land has become Rockefeller State Park Preserve. A former reservoir used by the city of New Rochelle has likewise been converted into county-run Pocantico Lake Park. While the river runs predominantly through those parks and suburban land, it is still one of the most polluted tributaries of the Hudson.

Course
In the past the Pocantico was considered to have two different sources, but today it is acknowledged that it rises from Echo Lake in the eponymous state park located in the town of New Castle between Saw Mill River Road (New York State Route 100) and the Taconic State Parkway, just southwest of the unincorporated hamlet of Millwood. Its surrounding terrain is primarily wooded and lightly developed outside of the two roads. The river begins at a dam on the lake's south end.

Shortly after draining the lake, the Pocantico flows under Route 100, which it remains closely parallel to for the next few miles. About  from its source, the stream crosses the town line from New Castle into neighboring Ossining, soon forming the boundary between that town and neighboring Mount Pleasant on its west. A short distance to the south, the river crosses back under Saw Mill River Road and receives its first tributary, the unnamed outlet of Campfire Lake to the northeast, as it, Route 100 and the North County Trailway diverge from the Taconic. The river, road and trail continue heading to the southwest as the Pocantico begins to form the Briarcliff Manor village line at the Chappaqua Road crossing.

Another 1,200 feet south of that crossing, it recrosses Saw Mill River Road just north of where it merges with the Briarcliff–Peekskill Parkway (also State Route 9A). After flowing under the parkway, it passes just east of downtown Briarcliff Manor and then crosses Saw Mill River Road and the parkway again, meandering a little further to the east into residential neighborhoods, then turning south through the village's Jackson Road Park. After that it flows due south to the immediate east of the parkway, itself to the immediate east of a steep slope.

After a slight swing east towards the Taconic, the river crosses under the parkway for the last time and continues on a more southwesterly course past  Beech Hill into  Pocantico Lakes Park. It widens amid swampy areas on either side as it receives Caney Brook from the north and then becomes Pocantico Lake. Midway along the lake, the municipal boundary leaves the river, putting it entirely within the town of Mount Pleasant.

From there, it flows southwestward again. At Old Sleepy Hollow Road it enters Rockefeller State Park Preserve, at over  the largest of the three protected areas the river flows through. The road continues to parallel it on the east as it turns south; on the west it is paralleled by the preserve's Pocantico River Trail, which follows it for a mile and a half. All three cross under Phelps Way (State Route 117) and turn south.

Within the preserve, the river meanders between hills amidst woodland interrupted by large clearings. Small stone bridges carry several of the preserve's trails across the river. About  after entering the preserve, the Pocantico crosses into the village of Sleepy Hollow. A short distance to the south, it receives Rockefeller Creek from the Pocantico Hills to the east. It bends north, away from the road, to receive its last named tributary, Gory Brook, from the north, where it turns abruptly south again. After another quarter-mile it crosses under the Old Croton Aqueduct, a National Historic Landmark (NHL), and leaves the preserve, continuing straight through a steep, narrow wooded ravine in a slightly southwesterly direction.

As it flows between Sleepy Hollow Cemetery to the west and the village's Douglas Park to the east, the river drops below  in elevation. On the north edge of another residential neighborhood, it bends eastward. After flowing under U.S. Route 9, it is again impounded, creating the mill pond at the Philipsburg Manor House, another NHL.

From that outlet, it meanders northwest past the former Tarrytown Truck Assembly plant, widening into a flood plain as it does. It bends north to pass another village park on the east, then north around that to divide the park from the residential area of Philipse Manor to its north. After flowing under the railroad tracks used by Metro-North's Hudson Line and Amtrak's Empire Service, it flows under the entrance road to the county's Kingsland Point Park and empties into the Hudson River.

Watershed
The Pocantico's  watershed covers areas of Ossining, Mount Pleasant, and New Castle, including Briarcliff Manor and Sleepy Hollow. It includes  of mapped freshwater wetlands and eleven dams. Approximately 14,866 people live within the watershed. It is largely suburban, but also contains parks, forests and wildlife, highways, utilities, and institutions.

History

The Weckquaesgeek Native American tribe, who established their primary settlement around the mouth of a river in present-day Dobbs Ferry, also had a village at the mouth of the Pocantico River called Alipconck, meaning "place of elms". The river historically set the dividing line between Mount Pleasant and Ossining.

The river was once called by the English as "the Mill river", while the Native Americans called it Pocanteco, a derivative of the Algonquin term Pockóhantès, meaning a "run between two hills". The Dutch called it the Sleepy haven kill. Dutch colonist Adriaen van der Donck's Beschrijvinge van Nieu Nederlandt, published in Amsterdam in 1655, referred to the Pocantico River as "Slapershaven" (Sleepers' Haven). The anglicized term "Sleepy Hollow" grew to apply to the Pocantico's river valley and later to the village of North Tarrytown in particular; the village changed its official name to Sleepy Hollow in 1996.

Frederick Philipse moved to the area and started purchasing land in the late 1600s, his properties would become known as Philipsburg Manor. He established his country seat at what was then known as North Tarrytown, at the mouth of the Pocantico River. A small community had already been established there when he arrived in 1683.

A ship called the Roebuck, which transported cargo to and from New York City, ended up in the river, where its keel was scavenged by the miller at the mill of the Philipsburg Manor House site.

The workers also cut rock and took out trees that lined the swamps to reclaim land for farming.

The North Tarrytown Assembly, a large automobile factory in Sleepy Hollow, was owned and operated by General Motors for much of its history; a 1923 expansion of the facility involved land-filling the river; two-thirds of the factory site was land formerly occupied by the river. The river was rerouted south of the site.

During 1999's Hurricane Floyd, the Pocantico was blocked by fallen trees and almost washed away the Philipsburg Manor historic site; about 70 employees of the parent organization Historic Hudson Valley assisted in its protection, along with the site's curators and security guards, and other village residents.

Ecology and environment

The organization Riverkeeper collects samples in three Pocantico River tributaries. The river downstream of Pocantico Lake is a habitat for brown trout. The river is stocked each spring; 540 brown trout were stocked in 2013, and 630 were anticipated to be stocked in the river in 2014. After a bacteria test completed on October 4, 2014, the river was found to have an Enterococcus bacteria count of greater than 2420, indicating high amounts of fecal matter in the water. Other tests of the river quality at the mouth of the river in Sleepy Hollow also contain high levels of Enterococcus bacteria. In fact, the high bacteria counts throughout the river were taken both after wet and dry weather. Dry weather tends to result in lower bacteria counts because less flooding results in less overflow from sewage treatment plants. The high levels of bacteria in the river resulted in beach advisories for the entire river. In 2014, $9.9 million was put aside to repair the Tarrytown sewage treatment plant in order to improve water quality in the region.

A Westchester County water quality study of the Pocantico River found that the chemical pollutants in the water met most of New York State Standards. The river met state standards on nitrate and phosphate levels, resulting in little cultural eutrophication in the water. Dissolved oxygen levels also met state standards with an average concentration of 9.853 milligrams per liter. Only the conductivity of the water failed state standards with conductivity levels averaging about three times the recommended levels.

American eels enters the river from the Hudson every spring, moving upstream over the course of one to three years. The eels often accumulate under a dam in Sleepy Hollow, and approximately 10% make it past the dam. The eels move upstream where the habitat is preferable, with lower polychlorinated biphenyl pollution, fewer parasites, faster growth rates for the eels, and a higher percentage of females in the population. Other species in the river include white perch, white sucker, yellow perch, golden shiner, and alewife, only in small numbers.

Adjacent to the river is a protected area known as Pocantico Lake Park. The park contains hiking trails as well as an abandoned water treatment plant from the New Rochelle Water Company. Nearby land fronting Pocantico Lake was purchased by a housing developer in 2020; local residents subsequently began a campaign to prevent the land from being used for more housing and protect the environment, including its supply of fresh water, and wildlife. As of 2023, a number of residents had pointed out flaws in the draft environmental impact statement.

In popular culture

The dénouement of "The Legend of Sleepy Hollow" is set at a bridge over the Pocantico River in the area of the Old Dutch Church and Burying Ground in Sleepy Hollow. As well, Washington Irving makes frequent mention of the Pocantico River in Chronicle III of his short story anthology Wolfert's Roost.

See also
 List of rivers of New York
 Pocantico Hills, New York

Notes

References

External links

 Pocantico Lake on OpenStreetMap
 Westchester County government map of the river and its watershed
 Mentions of The Pocantico in Wolfert's Roost
 The Pocantico River Watershed Conservancy

Briarcliff Manor, New York
Mount Pleasant, New York
Sleepy Hollow, New York
Tributaries of the Hudson River
Rivers of New York (state)
Rivers of Westchester County, New York
Pocantico Hills, New York